Juri Gonzi (born 6 April 1994) is a Russian-Italian footballer who plays as a midfielder for  club Piacenza.

Club career
Gonzi signed for AlbinoLeffe in August 2016. As of 2017, he was the only Russian footballer playing in Italy.

On 29 September 2020 he signed a two-year contract with Piacenza. He left Piacenza at the end of the 2021–22 season, and then returned to the club on 13 October 2022 until the end of the 2022–23 season.

Career statistics

Club

Notes

References

1994 births
Living people
Footballers from Saint Petersburg
Russian people of Italian descent
Russian footballers
Association football midfielders
Serie C players
A.C.N. Siena 1904 players
A.C. Cuneo 1905 players
Mantova 1911 players
U.C. AlbinoLeffe players
Piacenza Calcio 1919 players
Russian expatriate footballers
Russian expatriate sportspeople in Italy
Expatriate footballers in Italy
Russia youth international footballers